The 1993–94 Florida Gators men's basketball team represented the University of Florida as a member of the Southeastern Conference during the 1993–94 NCAA men's basketball season. Led by head coach Lon Kruger, the Gators reached the Final Four for the first time in program history, and finished with an overall record of 29–8 (12–4 SEC).

Roster

Schedule and results

|-
!colspan=12 style=| Non-conference Regular season

|-
!colspan=12 style=| SEC Regular season

|-
!colspan=12 style=| SEC Tournament

|-
!colspan=12 style=| NCAA Tournament

Rankings

Awards and honors
Dan Cross – Honorable Mention, AP All-America Team
Lon Kruger – SEC Coach of the Year

References

Florida Gators men's basketball seasons
Florida
Florida
NCAA Division I men's basketball tournament Final Four seasons
Florida Gators
Florida Gators